The Crowsnest River is a tributary to the Oldman River in southwestern Alberta, Canada.

Location

It passes into the foothills near Burmis and reaches the western margin of the Alberta plains near Lundbreck.

Fish species

The Crowsnest River is highly productive with a substantial insect population fueling a world-class sport fishery for rainbow, westslope cutthroat, bull, hybrid trout ("cutbow" cutthroat and rainbow trout crosses), brown trout (below Lundbreck Falls), mountain whitefish, and various species of suckers.

See also
 List of rivers of Alberta

References

Rivers of Alberta
South Saskatchewan River
Rivers of the Canadian Rockies